Jördis Triebel (born 30 October 1977) is a German film and stage actress.

Early life 
Triebel grew up the second oldest of four sisters in the Prenzlauer Berg locality of Berlin. Through her mother, who before the fall of the Berlin Wall was a props mistress at the "Theater der Freundschaft" (English: Theater of Friendship, today known as the Theater an der Parkaue), she was exposed to the world of theatre early on, sometimes being able to sit in on rehearsals.

Education 
From 1997 to 2001, Triebel studied acting at the Ernst Busch Academy of Dramatic Arts.

Career

Theatre 
After she graduated, Triebel was an actress with the Bremer Theater. She belonged to the ensemble cast up until 2004. Whilst there Triebel among other things worked on the production of Henrik Ibsen's The Master Builder, Shakespeare's Romeo and Juliet, Hamlet and additionally Mark Ravenhill's Some Explicit Polaroids.

After cutting ties with the Bremer Theater in 2004, Triebel worked with the Schauspielhaus Zürich (English: The Zürich playhouse) during 2004 and 2005 for a short time, where she acted in Arthur Schnitzler's Das weite Land, a 1911 tragi-comedy about light-bulb producer Friedrich Hofreiter and his affair with his wife's banker's accountant, Adele. In 2006, she personified "Italy" in the Cologne playhouse's production of Europa für Anfanger (English: Europe for beginners).

Television and film 
After a guest role in the TV series Wolffs Revier in 2005, Triebel gained her first major role in a film as the strongwoman/pig farmer Emma in Emma's Bliss. For this role, she received a nomination to the Deutscher Filmpreis (English: the German Film Awards). She was awarded a further nomination to the Deutscher Filmpreis for her performance as a supporting actress as the mother of the titular pope in Pope Joan. For the main role in West, Triebel was awarded for best actress in the 2013 Montreal World Film Festival. Triebel received international attention for her portrayal of Katharina Nielsen in the 2017 Netflix series Dark. She subsequently performed in supporting roles in the Netflix series Babylon Berlin (2017) and The Empress (2022).

Triebel's film credits include , West, Lagerfeuer (English: Campfire) and Emma's Bliss.  She has also had a re-occurring role on the television series KDD – Kriminaldauerdienst.

Personal life 
Triebel has two sons with German actor Matthias Weidenhöfer, from whom she separated in 2014.

Filmography
 2003: Lange Tage, Director: Antje Busse, Short film, Deutsche Film- und Fernsehakademie Berlin (dffb)
 2005: Wolffs Revier: Herzblut, Director: Jürgen Heinrich, TV Series, SAT.1
 2006: Emma's Bliss, Director: Sven Taddicken
 2006: heteros nomos, Director: Kai Gero Lenke, Short film
 2006: Speed Dating, Director: Gregor Buchkremer, Short film
 2007–2010: KDD – Kriminaldauerdienst, TV Series, ZDF
 2007: , Director: Maria von Heland, Straight-to-TV Movie, SAT.1
 2007: Eine gute Mutter, Director: Matthias Glasner, Straight-to-TV Movie
 2007: Der Kommissar und das Meer: Den du nicht siehst, Director: Anno Saul, TV Series, ZDF
 2008: A Woman in Berlin, Director: Max Färberböck
 2008: Das Duo, Director: Maris Pfeiffer, TV Series, ZDF
 2008: , Director: 
 2009: This Is Love, Director: Matthias Glasner
 2009: Pope Joan, Director: Sönke Wortmann
 2010: The Hairdresser, Director: Doris Dörrie
 2010: Tatort: Am Ende des Tages, Director: Titus Selge, TV Series
 2011: Familiengeheimnisse, Director: Carlo Rola, Straight-to-TV Movie, ZDF
 2011: Freilaufende Männer, Director: Matthias Tiefenbacher, Straight-to-TV Movie, WDR
 2011: , Director: Edward Berger, Straight-to-TV Movie, ARD
 2012: Rosa Roth: Trauma, Director: Carlo Rola, TV Series, ZDF
 2013: My Sisters, Director: Lars Kraume
 2013: West, Director: Christian Schwochow
 2013: Das Jerusalem-Syndrom, Director: Dror Zahavi, Straight-to-TV Movie, ARD
 2013: Der fast perfekte Mann, Director: Vanessa Jopp
 2013: Wolfskinder, Director: Rick Ostermann
 2015: Me and Kaminski, Director: Wolfgang Becker
 2015: Blochin – Die Lebenden und die Toten, Director: Matthias Glasner, TV Miniseries, ZDF
 2015: , Director: Lars Kraume
 2015: One Breath, Director: Christian Zübert
 2016: , Director: Lars Kraume, Straight-to-TV Movie, ARD
 2017: Dark, TV Series
 2017: Babylon Berlin, TV Series
 2018: The Silent Revolution, Director: Lars Kraume
 2022: The Empress as Princess Ludovika of Bavaria, mother of Helene and Elisabeth
 2023: Someday We'll Tell Each Other Everything

References

External links

1977 births
Living people
German film actresses
Best Actress German Film Award winners
21st-century German actresses
People from East Berlin
People from Pankow